Nypa or NYPA may refer to:

 Nypa (plant), a genus of palms
 New York Power Authority
 Not Your Personal Army, a phrase commonly used by Anonymous

See also 

 Nipa (disambiguation)